Zabwedaung Mibaya, born Shin Hlaing and known by her royal titles, Thiri Mingala Yuza Mahe and Maladewi, was a queen of fourth rank of King Mindon Min during the Konbaung dynasty. She was later promoted to Devi-level queen. 

Zabwedaung Mibaya was the sister of Lamaing Wun, minister of Lamaing. She had three daughters and a son, but only two daughters survived. She died in 1857 at Mandalay.

References

See also 

 Konbaung dynasty
 List of Burmese consorts

Konbaung dynasty
Burmese Buddhists
Queens consort of Konbaung dynasty
1905 deaths